Each modern Japanese prefecture has a unique flag, most often a bicolour geometric highly stylised design (mon), often incorporating the characters of the Japanese writing system and resembling minimalistic company logos. A distinct feature of these flags is that they use a palette of colours not usually found in flags, including orange, purple, aquamarine and brown.

Some prefectures also have alternative official flags called . They may be used on less formal occasions. Famous symbol flags include the one used in Tokyo.

Flags of prefectures of Japan

Symbol mark flag

Historical flags

See also 
 Flag of Japan
 List of Japanese flags
 Prefectures of Japan

Flags of country subdivisions
Prefectures